The Girls Singles tournament of the 2013 BWF World Junior Championships was held from October 29 until November 3. The winner of last edition was Nozomi Okuhara.

Akane Yamaguchi who lost in the final last year, made a redemption this year, after beating her compatriot Aya Ohori in the all-Japanese final 21-11, 21-13.

Seeded 

  Aya Ohori (final)
  Busanan Ongbumrungpan (semi-final)
  Stefani Stoeva (quarter-final)
  Akane Yamaguchi (champion)
  He Bingjiao (semi-final)
  Kim Hyo-min (quarter-final)
  Delphine Lansac (second round)
  Hanna Ramadhini (quarter-final)
  Chen Yufei (fourth round)
  Pornpawee Chochuwong (third round)
  Kim Na-young (fourth round)
  Lee Min-ji (fourth round)
  Liang Xiaoyu (quarter-final)
  Maja Pavlinic (third round)
  Martina Repiska (second round)
  Ruthvika Shivani Gadde (fourth round)

Draw

Finals

Top Half

Section 1

Section 2

Section 3

Section 4

Bottom Half

Section 5

Section 6

Section 7

Section 8

References 
Main Draw (Archived 2013-10-28)

2013 BWF World Junior Championships
2013 in youth sport